Notodden Blues Festival (NBF) is one of the largest blues music festivals in Europe and the largest in Scandinavia. The festival is held in Notodden, Norway, usually in early August. It has been running annually since 1988.

The festival does not aim to be the biggest of its type, but to become Europe's "largest blues experience", which is reflected in their emphasis on quality over quantity.

History
 
In 1988, thirteen local blues enthusiasts gave their personal guarantee to the bank and were granted a cash credit, and the first Notodden Blues Festival took place. The credit from the bank turned out to be unnecessary, and the festival soon became one of Norway's most popular music festivals. Today, the Notodden Blues Festival is the largest "pure" blues festival in Scandinavia, expanding from 2,000 sold tickets (NOK 200,000 gross ticket sales) to 24,500 sold tickets (NOK 12,000,000 gross ticket sales) in 17 years.

Organization
NBF is an ideal organization, where the General Assembly is the highest authority. Every year, the General Assembly elects a new board, consisting of one leader and six board members. The General Assembly provides the guidelines and financial frames wherein the Board can operate.

In 1992, NBF established the Notodden Blues Festival Foundation. The goal of this entity is to secure the financial costs needed to operate the festival. Presently, the "operation capital " controlled by the Foundation is NOK 900,000, which has been accumulated as a result of the economic success of previous festivals.

Youth seminars 
Each year, young people between the ages of 14 and 18 are given the opportunity to be a part of the "New Generation of the Blues".  Forty youths are chosen to participate in this seminar.  Participants, though mostly from Norway, come from as far away as Mississippi, U.S.A.  Professional instructors, with backgrounds ranging from studio, touring and television, guide the seminar's students through "one on one", as well as group classes.  The seminar includes the disciplines of harmony, playing by ear, instrument/equipment maintenance and the "music business". The seminar is held over six days, starting on the Monday before the festival opening.  During the course, each student is given the opportunity to work in the studio and a "studio quality" CD is produced afterwards for each of the participants.
The seminar closes on Saturday with a concert performed by the seminar members.  This concert is a part of the festival program and is attended by an audience of thousands.

List of artists

1980s
1988
Howlin’ Wilf And The Vee Jays (UK)
The Balham Alligators (UK)
Barry Cuda (USA)
Tom Principato (USA)
Good Time Charlie (N)
Notodden Blues Band (N)
The R&B Express (N)

1989
Lazy Lester (USA)
Chris Cain (USA)
Mannish Boys (USA)
Ford Blues Band (USA)
Roy Book Binder (USA)
Smalltown Blyes Band (DK)
Hungry John & The Blue Shadows (N)
Notodden Blues Band (N)
Steinar Albrigtsen (N)
The R&B Express (N)
Two For The Blues (N)
Malvina (N)
Kåre Virud (N)
Just Married (N)
Jaybirds (N)
Blåmenn (N)

1990s
1990
Joe Louis Walker & The Boss Talkers (USA)
Katie Webster (USA)
Lowell Fulson (USA)
Charlie Musselwhite (USA)
Diamond Teeth Mary (USA)
Big Town Playboys (UK)
Robert Kyle (USA)
Alan Haynes (USA)
Lynwood Slim Band (USA)
Rock Bottom & The Cutaways (USA)
Reidar Larsen (N)
Barfly Squatters (N)
Solid Slim With Solid Support (N)
The R&B Express (N)
Sanni's Kæmpingvogn (N)
Florrie & Nattergalene (N)
Mulens Portland Combo (N)
Jigsaw Puzzle (N)
Notodden Blues Band (N)
Just Married (N)
Tom & The Tom Toms (N)

1991
Jimmy Witherspoon & Robben Ford (USA)
Lonnie Brooks Band (USA)
Earl King (USA)
Jimmy Rogers & Bob Margolin Band (USA)
Stan' Chicken Shack
Chris Cain Band (USA)
Bobby Mack & Night Train (USA)
Barry Cuda (USA)
Pelle Lindström & Blow Your Blues (S)
Ba Ba Blues (S)
Shades Of Blue (DK)
Chicago Blues Meeting (N)
The Boys In The Band (N)
Sugar Daddies (N)
Corny Horns (N)
Sizz & The Blue Bag (N)
Just Married Band (N)
The R&B Express (N)
Notodden Blues Band (N)

1992
Junior Wells (USA)
Charles Brown (USA)
Koko Taylor (USA)
Five Blind Boys Of Alabama (USA)
Lou Ann Barton (USA)
James Harman Band (USA)
The Smokin' Joe Kubek Band (USA)
Debbie Davies Band (USA)
King Pleasure And The Biscuit Boys (UK)
Little Charlie & The Nightcats (USA)
Mick Abrahams’ Blodwyn Pig (UK)
The Down Home Cooking Blues Band (S)
Nightcats (S)
Göran Wennerbrandt (S)
Notodden Blues Band (N)
Barfly Squatters (N)
Kåre Virud (N)
Toini & The Tomcats (N)
Boye's Combo (N)
Blæster (N)
Wentzel (N)
Vidar Busk & The Bushmen (N)
Oddvar Solheim & The Hard Luck Blues Band (N)
Broke’n’Proud (N)
The R&B Express (N)
Just Married Band (N)

1993
Clarence Gatemouth Brown (USA)
Rod Piazza & The Mighty Flyers (USA)
The Duke Robillard Band (USA)
Kenny Neal (USA)
C.J. Chenier & His Hot Rods (USA)
Kim Simmonds & Savoy Brown (UK/USA)
Otis Grand And The Big Blues Band (UK)
Louisiana Red & Carey Bell (USA)
Diz Watson Band (UK)
Hans Theessink & Blue Groove (HOL)
Jimmy Thackery & The Drivers (USA)
Thomas Stelzer (GER)
Voices Of Spirit (DK)
Sven Zetterberg & Chicago Express (S)
Stefan Sjöholm (S)
Norsk Utflukt (N)
Marianne Antonsen Band (N)
The R&B Express (N)
Mulens Portland Combo (N)
The Dicemen (N)
Black Cat Bones (N)
Barfly Squatters (N)
Frets (N)
Painless (N)
First Water (N)
Bjørn Berge & Jan Flaaten (N)

1994
Johnny Guitar Watson (USA)
Denise LaSalle (USA)
Elvin Bishop (USA)
Charlie Musselwhite (USA)
Mick Taylor's All Star Blues Band (UK)
Homesick James (USA)
Gospel Harmoneers (USA)
Chris Farlowe (UK)
Sherman Robertson Band (USA)
Mike Morgan and the Crawl (USA)
R.J. Mischo Blues Band (USA)
The Guy Forsyth Band (USA)
Tom Pomposello (USA)
Queen Bee & The Zydeco Amigos (S)
Bluesväder (S)
Frimer Band (DK)
Reidar Larsen (N)
Hungry John & The Blues Shadows (N)
Bald’n’Delicious (N)
Six Pack (N)
Berge & Flaaten (N)
Crawlin’ Kingsnakes (N)
Nickels & Dimes (N)
C.I.A. (N)
T.I.’s Blue Master (N)
Barfly Squatters (N)
Turnpike Road (N)
First Water (N)
Stratoblasters (N)
JB's Low-Key-Crew (N)

1995
The Fabulous Thunderbirds (USA)
Roomful Of Blues (USA)
Billy Boy Arnold (USA)
Johnnie Johnson (USA)
John P. Hammond (USA)
The Mighty Clouds Of Joy (USA)
Lonnie Pitchford (USA)
Little Charlie & The Nightcats (USA)
Earl Thomas (USA)
Bob Margolin (USA)
Jess Roden & The Humans (UK)
Teddy Morgan & The Sevilles (USA)
Alan Haynes (USA)
Lee Oskar (USA)
Bluescasters (GER)
Knut Reiersrud (N)
Reidar Larsen & The Boogie Bastards with The Spirit Of Love Singers (N/USA)
Clement's Blue Corner (DK)
Sue Sergel & Jump 4 Joy (S)
Sven Zetterberg & Chicago Express (S)
Blues Bag (S)
Good Time Charlie (N)
Notodden Super Session (N)
Larsen's Last Chance (N)
Buckshot Hunters (N)
Mulens Portland Combo (N)
Hard Luck Blues Band (N)
The R&B Express (N)
Power Supply (N)
Painless (N)
Frets (N)
First Water (N)
Turnpike Road (N)
Roland All Stars (N)

1996
The Robert Cray Band (USA)
Splinter Group featuring Peter Green (UK)
Luther Allison (USA)
Canned Heat (USA)
Bernie Marsden & Snowy White (UK)
Omar & The Howlers (USA)
The Soul Stirrers (USA)
Magic Slim & The Teardrops (USA)
Roy Rogers & The Delta Rhythm Kings (USA)
R.L. Burnside Trio (USA)
Corey Harris (USA)
Gary Primich (USA)
Dana Gillespie (UK)
Mississippi Heat (USA)
The Persuasions (USA)
B.B. & The Blues Shacks (GER)
Blues Mobile Band (RUS)
Big Man Clayton & The 44s (UK)
J. Leino & Blues Guys (FIN)
Tommy Cougar & The Stingrays (S)
Black Cat Bones (N)
Bryggerigangen Bluesband (N)
Daryl McDade (N)
Earl Wilson (N)
Knut Nordhagen (N)
Kristin Berglund (N)
Notodden Super Session (N)
Peer Gynt (N)
Spoonful Of Blues (N)
Tale Lid Lerheim (N)
Talgøenga Blueslag (N)
Tiger City Jukes (N)

1997
B.B. King (USA)
Ike Turner Revue (USA) 
Otis Rush (USA)
Doug Sahm & The Last Real Texas Blues Band (USA) 
Angela Strehli (USA) 
Johnny Adams (USA) 
Blue Rock’it Records Blues Revue (USA)
The Paul deLay Band (USA) 
The Persuasions (USA)
Stan Webb's Chicken Shack (UK)
Alvin Youngblood Hart (USA) 
Louisiana Red (USA) 
Joanna Connor (USA) 
John Primer (USA) 
Eddie Bo Trio (USA) 
Big Jack Johnson & The Oilers (USA) 
King Pleasure & The Biscuit Boys (UK) 
Big Town Playboys (UK) 
Debbie Davies (USA) 
Monster Mike Welch (USA) 
KnockOut Greg & Blue Weather (S) 
Harmonica Henry & The Blues Rockers (S) 
Norsk Utflukt (N) 
Wentzel (N) 
Notodden Blues Band (N) 
The R&B Express (N) 
Backbone (N) 
Vidar Busk & His True Believers (N) 
Mulens Portland Combo (N)
Pigalle Blues Band (N) 
Chicago Bound (N) 
Cajun Gumbo (N) 
The Blue Juke Lords (N) 
Maarud-kara (N)

1998
Bo Diddley (USA)
The Blues Brothers Band (USA)
The Fabulous Thunderbirds (USA)
James Cotton (USA)
Kim Wilson's Blues Express (USA) featuring Big Al Blake, Fred Kaplan, Rusty Zinn, Larry Taylor, Richard Innes
Marcia Ball (USA)
C. J. Chenier and The Red Hot Louisiana Band (USA)
Pinetop Perkins (USA)
Steady Rollin’ Bob Margolin (USA)
Deborah Coleman (USA)
Johnny Dyer (USA)
Super Chikan (USA)
Terry Hanck & The Soulrockers (USA)
Mason Ruffner (USA)
The Myles Family (USA)
Nine Below Zero (UK)
Hans Theessink (HOL)
B.B. & The Blues Shacks (GER)
Rolf Wikström (S)
Matti Norlin (S)
Reidar Larsen & The Spirit Of Love Singers (N/USA)
Knut Reiersrud (N)
Vidar Busk & His True Believers (N)
Marianne Antonsen Band (N)
Buzz Brothers (N)
Good Time Charlie (N)
Knut Nordhagen & Blue Rhythm Pack (N)
Kristin Berglund (N)
Late Night Show (N)
M.B. & The Conmen (N)
Bjørn Berge (N)
Pure Pleasure Band (N)
Union Blues Band (N)
Blues In A Cop (N)

1999
Buddy Guy (USA)
Jimmie Vaughan (USA)
Bobby Rush (USA)
Duke Robillard Band (USA)
Trudy Lynn (USA)
Mighty Sam McClain (USA)
Walter Trout (USA)
Sista Monica (USA)
Larry McCray (USA)
Roy Gaines (USA)
The Love Dogs (USA)
Philadelphia Jerry Ricks (USA)
Paul Rishell & Annie Raines (USA)
Michelle Willson (USA)
Bruce Katz Band (USA)
Johnny Hoy & The Bluefish (USA)
Rock Bottom (USA)
Karen Carroll and Steve ”BigMan” Clayton (USA, UK)
Harmony Harmoneers (USA)
El Fish (B)
Sven Zetterberg Blues Band (S)
Bluebirds (S)
Vidar Busk & His True Believers (N)
Tiger City Jukes (N)
Hungry John (N)
Notodden Blues Band (N)
Margit Bakken Blues Orkester (N)
Backbone (N)
Pure Pleasure Kings(N)
Spoonful of Blues (N)
Jolly Jumper & Big Moe
Kongsberg Groove Department (N)
Up to Fly (N)
Terry Lehns Orkester(N)
Hjartdal Storband (N)

2000s
2000
Taj Mahal (USA)
Wilson Pickett (USA)
Keb' Mo' (USA)
Little Milton (USA)
Rod Piazza & The Mighty Flyers (USA)
Mighty Sam McClain (USA)
Lucky Peterson (USA)
Bernard Allison (USA)
Rory Block (USA)
John Sebastian (USA)
Mitch Woods (USA)
Eric Sardinas (USA)
Mighty Mo Rodgers (USA)
Robert Cage (USA)
C.J. Chenier & His Red Hot Louisiana Band (USA)
Alex Schultz & Tad Robinson (USA)
Larry Johnson (USA)
The Fins (USA)
Luddy Samms (UK)
Angela Brown & The Mighty 45s (UK)
The Extraordinaires (UK)
Peps Persson (S)
Mönsterås Blues Band (S)
Blue Magic (DK)
SP-Just-Frost (DK)
H.P. Lange (DK)
Groovy Eyes (FIN)
Big Bang (N)
Kåre Virud (N)
Reidar Larsen & The Spirit of Love Singers (N/USA)
Good Time Charlie (N)
Knut Nordhagen & Bluepack (N)
J.T. Lauritsen & Buckshot Hunters (N)
Texas Twisters (N)
Pigalle Guitar Ensemble (N)
Kirsten Bråten Berg & Kristin Berglund (N)
Spoonful of Blues (N)
Margit Bakken Bluesorkester m/Trond Ytterbø (N)
Hydramatix (N)
DJ Strangefruit (N)
DJ Dust (N)
Ronnie Jacobsen vs Digitality (N)
Up to Fly (N)
Hot little Mama (N)
Jolly Jumper & Big Moe (N)
Last Train Home (N)
First Water (N)
Square One (N)
Terry Lehns (N) 

2001
Clarence Gatemouth Brown & the Gate's Express (USA)
Al Kooper and the Funky Facility (USA)
Elvin Bishop and Little Smokey Smothers (USA)
Charlie Musselwhite (USA)
Shemekia Copeland (USA)
Anson Funderburgh and the Rockets Featuring Sam Myers (USA)
Terry Evans (USA)
Candye Kane (USA)
Geoff Muldaur with Stephen Bruton & Bill Rich (USA)
The Blues Band (UK)
Bob Hall (UK)
Paul Jones and Dave Kelly (UK)
John Crampton (UK)
Michael Roach (USA)
Snooks Eaglin (USA)
Earl Thomas (USA)
Little George & The Blue Stars (UK)
Blues Mobile (GEO)
Texas Twisters (N)
Reidar Larsen (N)
Vidar Busk (N)
Steinar Albrigtsen (N)
Bjørn Berge (N)
Kristin Berglund (N)
Kåre Virud (N)
Knut Hem (N)
Ronnie J/Salador (N)
Spoonful of Blues (N)
Jolly Jumper and Big Moe (N)
Åmund Maarud Band (N)
Daniel and the Sacred Harp (N)
Harry Banks Buzzers (S)
Little Andrew & The Blue Masters (N)
Terry Lehns (N)
BluesTown Voices (N)
DJ Ole Abstract (N)
DJ Dark Norsk (N)
Hydramatix (N)
Up To Fly (N)
Tommy Tee (N)
DJ Gordon (N)
N-Light-N (N)
Warlocks (N)
Diaz (N)
Opaque (N)
The Blue Devils (N)
Vetrhus Bluesband (N)
Tiger City Jukes (N)

2002
Buddy Guy (USA)
Dr. John (USA)
Tony Joe White (USA)
Bjørn Berge (N)
Ana Popovic (Yug)
T-Model Ford (USA)
Paul "Wine" Jones (USA)
Robert Belfour (USA)
Junior Watson Band (USA)
James Mathus & His Knock Down Society (USA)
Richard Johnston (USA)
Sven Zetterberg (Swe)
KnockOut Greg & Blue Weather (SWE)
Knut Reiersrud (N)
Kåre Virud Band (N)
Kristin Berglund Band (N)
Notodden Bluesband & Torhild Sivertsen (N)
Spoonful of Blues (N)
Jolly Jumper & Big Moe (N)
J.T. Lauritsen & The Buckshot Hunters (N)
Amund Maarud Band (N)
The Real Thing (N)
Seasick Steve & The Level Devils (USA/N)
Margit Bakken's Bluesorkester (N)
Rita Engedalen & Morten Omlid (N)
Up to Fly (N)
Jumpin’ Jerry & The Blue Healers (N)
Dr. Bekken (N)
Trond Slyngstadli (N)
Dockery Dawgs (N)
Rattle Snakin’ Daddies (N)
Terry Lehns (N)

2003
Irma Thomas (USA)
Little Milton (USA)
Eddie Floyd (USA) 
Carla Thomas (USA) 
Shemekia Copeland (USA) 
Omar & The Howlers (USA)
Marcia Ball (USA) 
Chris Thomas King (USA) 
Pinetop Perkins (USA) 
Snooky Pryor (USA)
Marvel Thomas & The Memphis Soulstars Orchestra (USA) 
Dave Hole (AUS) 
Mark Hummel (USA) 
James Harman (USA) 
Billy Branch (USA) 
The Jelly Roll Kings (USA) 
Big Jack Johnson, George "Mojo" Buford & Sam Carr (USA) 
Super Chikan (USA) 
Guy Davies (USA) 
Sean Costello (USA) 
Kenny Brown (USA) 
The Black Keys (USA) 
Little Victor & Miss Sophie (USA/F)
Cato Salsa Experience (N) 
Notodden Blues Band & Thorhild Sivertsen (N) 
Spoonful of Blues (N) 
Amund Maarud Band (N) 
Vidar Busk (N)
Margit Bakken (N) 
Knut Nordhagen & Blue Pack (N)
Kurt Slevigen (N)
Up to Fly (N) 
Hungry Joh & The Blue Shadows (N) 
NoFish Bertheussen (N)
Seasick Steve & The Level Devils (N)
The Night Losers (ROM)
Good Time Charlie (N)
Dr. Bekken (N)
Allen's Pit (N)

2004
John Mayall & The Bluesbreakers (UK/USA)
Jeff Healey (CAN)
The Fabulous Thunderbirds (USA)
The Jon Spencer Blues Explosion (USA)
Rod Piazza & The Mighty Flyers (USA)
The British Blues Masters (UK)
Eric Sardinas (USA)
The Kim Wilson Show (USA)
Nine Below Zero (UK)
Eric Andersen (USA)
The Cadillac Kings (UK)
Big Bang (N)
Knut Reiersrud/Sven Zetterberg Blues Band (SWE/N)
Vidar Busk (N)
Bjørn Berge (N)
Amund Maarud (N)
Kåre Virud (N)
Knut Buen (N)
Notodden Blues Band & Torhild Sivertsen (N)
Kid Andersen & The Rock Awhile Band (N)
R.C. Finnigan & The Blue Flames (USA/N)
J.T. Laurtisen & The Buckshot Hunters (N)
Kristin Berglund (N)
Hungry John (N)
Texas Twisters (N)
Rita Engedalen & Backbone (N)
Dockery Dawgs (N)
Greasy Gravy (N)
The Ticklers (N)
Eirik Bergene Band (N)
Steady Steele (N)
Up to Fly (N)
That's Alright Mama (N)
Grønningen (N)
The Rev. John Bluesband (N)

2005
Solomon Burke (USA)
Delbert McClinton (USA)
Charlie Musselwhite (USA)
Walter Trout & The Radicas (USA)
Scotty Moore (USA)
Hubert Sumlin (USA)
David Johansen (USA)
Robert Lockwood Jr. (USA)
Jeremy Spencer (USA)
Guitarmageddon (USA/N)
Tinariwen (MALI)
New York Dolls (USA)
Beth Hart (USA)
Bernard Allison (USA)
Guitar Shorty (USA)
Bettye LaVette (USA)
Nora Jean Bruso (USA)
Rising Star Fife & Drum (USA)
Nalle/Lending & Poulsen (DK)
Knut Buen (N)
Kåre Virud Band (N)
Trond Ytterbø Band (N)
Spoonful of Blues (N)
J. T. Lauritsen (N)
We (N)
Good Time Charlie (N)
Bryggerigangen Bluesband (N)
Dr. Bekken (N)
Rita Engedalen (N)
Morten Omlid (N)
JB & The Delta Jukes (N)
Tommy Kristiansen & Eirik Bergene (N)
Varpen (N)
Camaros (N)
John Olav/Audun/Halvor (N)
Tommy & The Runawayboys with Eirik Bergene (N)
Svante & Filip (S)
Stormy Monday (N)
Notodden Choir (N)
Grønningen (N)

2006
Gary Moore (UK)
Johnny Winter (USA)
The Jeff Healey Band (CAN)
The Fabulous Thunderbirds (USA)
Canned Heat (USA)
Eddie "The Chief" Clearwater (USA)
David Lindley (USA)
Omar & The Howlers (USA)
Beth Hart (USA)
Nick Curran & Kirk Fletcher Band (USA)
Corey Harris (USA)
Angela Brown & The Mighty 45's (USA/UK)
Vargas Blues Band feat. Devon Allman (ESP/USA)
Reidar Larsen & Roy Rogers with The Storytellers (N/USA)
Sven Zetterberg (S)
Little Victor (I)
Nalle Trio (D)
Trond Ytterbø Band (N)
Good Time Charlie (N)
Spoonful of Blues (N)
Knut Nordhagen & Bluepack (N)
The R&B Express m/ Margit Bakken, Rita Engedalen, Jørn Pedersen & Kjell Gunnar Johansen (N)
Rita Engedalen/Morten Omlid (N)
Remme Brothers Band (N)
NBK Husbanders (N)
Magre Benum (N)
Begge 3 (N)
Jørun Bøgeberg (N)
Johnny Augland & The Gylne Snitt (N)
Hard Bargain (N)
Eagle Ridin’ Papas (N)
Gospel 2006 (N)
Neros Blues Band (S)
Grønningen (N)
Notodden 40 år med Rock, Beat & Blues
Teen Beats (N)
Harmony (N)
Telemark Blueslag (N)
Grus (N)
Notodden Blues Band (N)
Swinging Ducktails (N)
Diesel (N)
Turnpike Road (N)
The R&B Express (N)
Spoonful of Blues (N)
Rita Engedalen & Backbone (N)
Laber Bris m/Oddbjørn Holla & John Olav Hovde (N)
Solmodne Menn (N)
Terry Lehns (N)
Margit Bakken Band (N)
Up to Fly (N)
Spider (N)

2007
The Neville Brothers (USA)
Alvin Lee (GB)
Steve Winwood (GB)
Delbert McClinton & His Band & from Texas special guest Teresa James (USA)
Omar Kent Dykes & Jimmie Vaughan's “Jimmy Reed Highway” feat. Lou Ann Barton (USA)
Knut Reiersrud (N)
Vidar Busk & The VooDudes (N)
Magic Slim & The Teardrops (USA)
Jeremy Spencer & Trond Ytterbø Band (GB/N)
The Mannish Boys (USA)
The Blues Band (GB)
Blues Guitar Women w. Sue Foley, Deborah Coleman & Roxanne Potvin (USA/CAN)
David “Honeyboy” Edwards (USA)
Watermelon Slim & The Workers (USA)
The Janiva Magness Band with special guest Debbie Davies (USA)
Ronnie Baker Brooks (USA)
Paul Oscher (USA)
James “Super Chikan” Johnson (USA)
Nalle Trio (DEN)
Dave Kelly (GB)
Bob Hall & Hilary Blythe (GB)
Kåre Virud Band (N)
The Original Notodden Bluesband (N)
Rita Engedalen & Backbone (N)
Spoonful Of Blues (N)
JT Lauritsen & The Buckshot Hunters (N)
Terry Lehns (N)
Texas Twisters (N)
Daniel Eriksen & the Pzydeco Sisters (N)
Rita Engedalen & Margit Bakken (N)
Dr. Bekken (N)
Spider (N)
Bedrock Blues Band (N)
Richard Tehler & The Licktones (N)
Al Jazeera (N)
Gønningen (N)

2008
Ray Davies (UK)
Koko Taylor (USA)
The Mick Fleetwood Blues Band featuring Rick Vito (GB/USA)
Big Bang (NOR)
Kenny Wayne Shepherd (USA)
Little Feat (USA)
James Cotton, Charlie Musselwhite & Kim Wilson with The Fabulous Thunderbirds (USA)
Bobby Rush (USA)
Janiva Magness (USA)
Pinetop Perkins and the Legends of Chicago Blues (USA)
Bob Margolin & Jerry Portnoy (USA)
Omar Kent Dykes (USA)
Rick Estrin & The Nightcats (USA/NOR)
Louisiana Red (USA)
Henry Butler (USA)
Super Chikan (USA)
Kenny Brown Band (USA)
Bruce Katz Band (USA)
Tad Robinson (USA)
Diunna Greenleaf (USA)
Ryan Shaw (USA)
Ian Siegal (GB)
Matt Schofield Trio (GB)
Gary Clarke, jr (USA)
Trampled Under Foot (USA)
Little Victor (USA)
Reidar Larsen & The Storytellers (NOR)
Kid Andersen (NOR)
Sven Zetterberg Band (SWE)
Nalle Trio (DEN)
Rita Engedalen & Backbone (NOR)
Mad & Hungry (NOR)
Spoonful Of Blues (NOR)
Åste Hunnes Sem & Kim Rune Hagen (NOR)
Haddy N'Jie (NOR)
Grande (NOR)
Jolly Jumper & Big Moe (NOR)
Billy T Band (NOR)
JB & The Delta Jukes (NOR)
Ljod (NOR)
Red Hot (NOR)
Hannah Tolf & Dick Ahlin (SWE)
Ellen Marie Løkslid & Hallvard Høiberg (NOR)
Gospel 2008 (NOR)

2009
Buddy Guy (USA)
Jack Bruce, Robin Trower & Gary Husband (GB)
Beth Hart (USA)
Joe Bonamassa (USA)
Shemekia Copeland (USA)
Jools Holland and His Rhythm & Blues Orchestra feat. Gilson Lavis, Dave Edmonds, Ruby Turner and Louise Mashall (GB)
Trampled Under Foot (USA)
Dwayne Dopsie & The Zydeco Hellraisers (USA)
Rick Estrin & The Nightcats (USA)
Super Chikan (USA)
Trudy Lynn (USA)
Roffe Wikström (SWE)
Bobby Jones feat. Kid Ramos (USA)
Cedric Burnside & Lightnin’ Malcolm (USA)
L. C. Ulmer (USA)
Robert “Wolfman” Belfour (USA)
T-Model Ford (USA)
The Soul of John Black (USA)
Homemade Jamz’ Blues Band (USA)
Oli Brown (GB)
Erja Lyytinen (FIN)
Joanne Shaw Taylor (GB)
Bjørn Berge (NOR)
Notodden Blues Band (NOR)
Noora Noor (NOR)
Kåre Virud & Jan Erik Vold (NOR)
Rita Engedalen & Backbone (NOR)
Halvard T. Bjørgum (NOR)
Good Time Charlie (NOR)
Spoonful of Blues (NOR)
Margit Bakken (NOR)
Ronnie Jacobsen's West Coast Blues Meeting (NOR)
Haddy N’Jie (NOR)
Patey's Pipe (NOR)
Trond Olsen Band (NOR)
Daniel Eriksen (NOR)
Giant Flesh (SWE)
The Robert Taylor Band (USA/NOR)
Runar Boyesen (NOR)
Terry Lehns (NOR)
Ellen M Trio (NOR)
Tomislav “Little Pigeon” Goluban (CRO)
Gospel 2009 (NOR)
Jens Fjelle (NOR) 
Trond Ytterbø (NOR) 
Kjell Gunnar (NOR) 
Øystein Ytterbø (NOR) 
Johannes Sundsvalen (NOR)
Jawbreakers (NOR)
And her name was Frank (NOR)
Ørkenkjøtt (NOR)
Gørund Fluge Samuelsen (NOR)
Espen Fjelle (NOR)
Jens Haugen (NOR)
Eskil Aasland (NOR)
Morten Omlid (NOR)

List of workshops
The festival has presented a multitude of workshops including:

Gospel Workshop – Harmony Harmoneers
The Tough Women of the Blues – Kristin Berglund
West Coast Swing – Lee Otterholt
The History of the Blues – Morten Omlid and Per Arvesen
Does the Blues come from the Muslims? – Knut Reiersud
Acoustic Blues Guitar – Jerry Ricks
Confessions of a Blues Singer – Rory Block
Folk Music meets the Blues – Kirsten Bråtenberg & Kristin Berglund
R.L. Burnside, Portrait of a Bluesman – K. Bjørneegen & Ø. Pharo
Boogie Woogie Piano Masterclass – Mitch Woods
Pre War Diatonic Harmonica Wizards – Richard Gjems
The Children of the Blues – Art Tipaldi with Shemica Copeland, James Harman, Kenny Brown
The Nobel Art of Harmonies – Geoff Muldaur
From Pepper's Lounge to the Filmore – Charlie Musselwhite, Elvin Bishop, Little Smokey Smothers, and Art Tipaldi
Janis Joplin, Rose of the Blues – Rita Engedalen & Morten Omlid
Hill Country Music and Alternative Instruments – Richard Johnston
Guitar Workshop – Junior Watson
Blues Talk – Tony Joe White & Øyvind Pharo
Stax is Back – Eddie Floyd, Carla Thomas & Marvell Thomas
Guitar Workshop – Dave Hole
The Story of My Life – Snooky Pryor with Art Tipaldi
Future Blues – Chris Thomas King, Little Milton, Dan Auerbach & Amund Maarud
Harmonica Workshop – Mark Hummel
A Salute to Alan Lomax – Anna Lomax
Guitar Stories - Walter Trout, Bernar Allison and Guitar Shorty 
The Guitar that Changed the World – Scotty Moore
Delbert McClinton – interview with Art Tipadli
What Really Happened - Jeremy Spencer
The New Guitar Slingers – Nick Curran, Kirk Fletcher, Devon Allman, Javier Vargas
Mississippi Hoodoo Man – Omar Dykes
From Mississippi to Chicago – David “Honeyboy” Edwards, Magic Slim, Ronnie Baker Brooks
Women Rocking the Blues – Janiva Magness, Debbie Davies, Sue Foley
The Real Blues – The Mannish Boys
Soul Blues – Bobby Rush, Tad Robinson, Ryan Shaw
Ten Days Out – Kenny Wayne Shepherd, Bob Margolin
Blues Harp Super Session – James Cotton, Charlie Musselwhite, Kim Wilson, Jerry Portnoy, Rick Estrin
In His Own Words - Mick Fleetwood
Talkin’ Blues – Jack Bruce, Robin Trower
Talkin’ Blues – Shemekia Copeland
M For Mississippi – Roger Stolier, Jeff Konkel, Kari Jones

Trivia
For the 2013 festival, both Snoop Dogg and Hugh Laurie asked to play at the festival, but were refused.

See also

List of blues festivals
List of folk festivals

References

External links
Notodden Blues Festival – official site
Notodden Blues Festival in Telen, Bluestowns Notodden's own local newspaper

Music festivals established in 1988
Blues festivals in Norway
Folk festivals in Norway
Notodden
Music festivals in Norway
1988 establishments in Norway